Patricia Crowley (born September 17, 1933) is an American actress. She was also frequently billed as Pat Crowley.

Early life
Crowley was born in Olyphant, Pennsylvania, the daughter of Helen (née Swartz) and coal mining foreman Vincent Crowley. Her sister Ann was also an actress.

Career
Crowley played Sally Carver in the film Forever Female (1953), starring Ginger Rogers and William Holden. She starred as Doctor Autumn Claypool alongside Dean Martin and Jerry Lewis in Money from Home (1953), and in their final film together Hollywood or Bust (1956), in which she played Terry Roberts.

Her roles in Forever Female and Money from Home brought her the Golden Globe Award for New Star of the Year - Actress.

She co-starred with Rosemary Clooney in a 1954 musical, Red Garters, and with Barbara Stanwyck and Fred MacMurray in the 1956 drama There's Always Tomorrow. She had a starring role opposite Tony Curtis in the boxing drama The Square Jungle (1955) and the Audie Murphy Western Walk the Proud Land, and was also featured in 1963's The Wheeler Dealers, a comedy starring James Garner and Lee Remick.

Crowley starred as Judy Foster in the daytime version of A Date with Judy on ABC-TV in 1951.

Crowley made guest appearances in many television series in the 1950s and 1960s, including the pilot for The Untouchables,  The Lieutenant, Crossroads, The Fugitive (1963 Episode 2 - The Witch) The Alfred Hitchcock Hour, Riverboat, The DuPont Show with June Allyson, Rawhide (with Clint Eastwood), Wanted: Dead or Alive (with Steve McQueen), The Eleventh Hour, The Roaring 20s, Cheyenne, Mr. Novak, The Twilight Zone, The Fugitive, 77 Sunset Strip, The Tab Hunter Show, The Andy Griffith Show and The Man from U.N.C.L.E.

She appeared as leading lady for both James Garner and Roger Moore in the same episode of Maverick, titled "The Rivals", a 1958 reworking of Richard Brinsley Sheridan's 1775 comedy of manners play. This was the only episode starring both Garner and Moore. Remarkably, she was billed in some Maverick episodes as "Patricia Crowley" and others as "Pat Crowley".

She starred from 1965 to 1967 as Joan Nash in the NBC-MGM television sitcom Please Don't Eat the Daisies, based on the 1957 book by Jean Kerr and the 1960 Doris Day/David Niven film of the same name. In 1975-1976, she played Georgia Cameron on the Joe Forrester television series.

Crowley sang and danced on The Dean Martin Show. She made guest appearances on episodes of Bonanza (in the episode "The Actress"), Charlie's Angels, Columbo, Police Woman, The Streets of San Francisco, Hawaii 5-0, The Rockford Files, The Feather and Father Gang, Hotel, Quinn Martin's Tales of the Unexpected (in the episode "The Force of Evil"), and Murder, She Wrote, as well as sitcoms  Happy Days, The Love Boat, Empty Nest, Roseanne, Frasier, and Friends.

She became known to a later era of television viewers for her roles on the serials Generations from 1989–90, Port Charles from 1997 to 2003, and The Bold and the Beautiful in 2005. She appeared as Emily Fallmont on 10 episodes of the nighttime soap opera Dynasty in 1986. More recently, Crowley portrayed the widow of baseball's Roger Maris in the biopic 61*, directed by Billy Crystal. She appeared in a 2006 episode of The Closer and a 2009 episode of Cold Case.

Throughout her career, she was confused with actress Kathleen Crowley, who guest-starred in many of the same television series during the same time frame (the 1950s and 1960s), though they never appeared together. They were not related. Walt Disney's actor Fess Parker noted in his Archive of American Television interview that  two actresses were named Crowley whom everyone was always mixing up, one tall (Pat) and one short (Kathleen), and that he was paired with the shorter Crowley for one project, despite being 6 feet 6 inches tall.

Personal life
Crowley has been married twice, first to attorney and entertainment agent Ed Hookstratten, whose clients included Elvis Presley, Johnny Carson, and Tom Brokaw, and since 1986 to television producer Andy Friendly.

Crowley, a Republican, endorsed Dwight Eisenhower for re-election in the 1956 presidential election.

Filmography

References

External links
 
 
 

1933 births
Living people
People from Olyphant, Pennsylvania
American film actresses
American soap opera actresses
New Star of the Year (Actress) Golden Globe winners
American television actresses
American stage actresses
Actresses from Pennsylvania
20th-century American actresses
21st-century American actresses
Western (genre) television actors
California Republicans
Pennsylvania Republicans